Gustave Maximilien Juste de Croÿ-Solre (12 September 1773 Château de l'Ermitage, near Condé-sur-l'Escaut, Nord - 1 January 1844 Rouen) was a French cardinal, Archbishop of Rouen, and a member of the House of Croy.

Life
Gustave was the son of Anne Emmanuel Ferdinand François, 8th Duke of Croy, and Auguste Friederike Wilhelmine zu Salm-Kyrburg.

He was ordained a priest on 3 November 1797 in Vienna. On 8 August 1817 he was appointed Bishop of Strasbourg by King Louis XVIII of France; the appointment was confirmed by Pope Pius VII on 23 August 1819. He was ordained a bishop on 9 January 1820 at the Church of St. Sulpice in Paris by Jean Charles de Coucy, Archbishop of Reims. He was made a Peer of France in 1822 and became Archbishop of Rouen on 4 July 1823.

In 1824 he assisted King Louis XVIII of France on his death bed and presided over his funeral in the Abbey of Saint-Denis.

On 21 March 1825 he was created a cardinal by Pope Leo XII.  He did not receive the red hat until 18 May 1829.  Three days later on 21 May 1829 he received the title Cardinal-Priest of Santa Sabina. He participated in the conclaves of 1829 and 1830-1831. He died of gout. His remains are buried in Rouen Cathedral.

References

External links
Biography

1773 births
1844 deaths
Peers of France
19th-century French cardinals
Archbishops of Rouen
Bishops of Strasbourg
Gustave Maximilien Juste de Croy-Solre